Year 767 (DCCLXVII) was a common year starting on Thursday (link will display the full calendar) of the Julian calendar, the 767th year of the Common Era (CE) and Anno Domini (AD) designations, the 767th year of the 1st millennium, the 67th year of the 8th century, and the 8th year of the 760s decade. The denomination 767 for this year has been used since the early medieval period, when the Anno Domini calendar era became the prevalent method in Europe for naming years.

Events 
 By place 

 Byzantine Empire 
 Byzantine–Bulgarian War: Emperor Constantine V invades Bulgaria across the Balkan Mountains, setting afire some settlements around the Bulgarian capital of Pliska. Constantine accepts a peace agreement with Pagan, the Bulgar ruler (khagan), whose land is in anarchy.

 Europe 
 The Franks, under King Pepin III ("the Short"), destroy resistance in central Aquitaine. They conquer the capital of Bordeaux, and devastate the whole region.
 Pepin III receives a Byzantine delegation at his court in Gentilly (southern suburbs of Paris). They discuss foreign policy regarding Italy, and Byzantine Iconoclasm.

 Africa 
 The Kharijite Berbers of Tlemcen and Tiaret try to conquer Ifriqiya from the Abbasid Caliphate, but fail to capture the capital of Kairouan (modern Tunisia).

 By topic 

 Religion 
 June 28 – Pope Paul I dies at Rome after a 10-year reign, in which he has protested against Constantine V's revival of Iconoclasm at Constantinople. He gives refuge to Greek monks who were expelled from the Byzantine Empire, and moves the relics of many saints from the catacombs to Roman churches. Duke Toto of Nepi has his layman brother elected to succeed Paul, under the name Constantine II.

Births 
 September 15 – Saichō, Japanese Buddhist monk (d. 822)
 Bishr al-Hafi, Muslim theologian (approximate date)
 Ja'far ibn Yahya, Persian vizier (d. 803)
 Muhammad ibn Idris al-Shafi`i, Muslim imam (d. 820) 
 Pepin the Hunchback, son of Charlemagne (approximate date)

Deaths 
 April 20 – Taichō, Japanese Buddhist monk (b. 682)
 June 28 – Paul I, pope of the Catholic Church (b. 700) 
 Abū Hanīfa, Muslim imam and scholar (b. 699)
 Aedh Ailghin, king of Uí Maine (Ireland)
 Constantine II, patriarch of Constantinople
 Ibn Ishaq, Muslim historian and hagiographer (or 761)
 Ibn Jurayj, Muslim scholar (approximate date)
 Muqatil ibn Sulayman, Muslim mufassir and theologian 
 Murchad mac Flaithbertaig, chief of the Cenél Conaill
 Toktu, ruler (khagan) of the Bulgarian Empire

References